The Samsung Replenish is an Android 2.3 smartphone.

This phone only supports Sprint and Boost Mobile.

See also
 Galaxy Nexus
 List of Android devices

References

Replenish
Samsung smartphones
Mobile phones introduced in 2011
Discontinued smartphones